Iran Electronics Industries or Integrated Electronics Industries(IEI, Persian: صنایع الکترونیک ایران (Sana-ey Electronik-e Iran); also known as , Sâlairan) is a state-owned subsidiary of Iran's Ministry of Defense. It is a diversified organization with operations in electronics, optics, electro-optics, medical equipment, communications, computer and semiconductors.

History
IEI was established as a government company in 1972 in order to develop military materials for the Iranian Military. IEI has developed a high potential in research and development (R&D) which is the technological backbone of the company. IEI is an amalgamation of different manufacturing plants and companies in different parts of the country.During the reign of Shah Mohammed Reza Pahlavi, the company used the missile facility at Shiraz.

Following the Iranian Revolution and the outbreak of the Iran–Iraq War, Iran began to reorganise its industries to establish a war orientated manufacturing and research focus. IEI was a natural candidate to come under the supervision of the Defense Industries Organization, where it has remained since.The new generation of Iran's national reconnaissance satellites called Toloo (Rise) have been designed and produced by IEI in 2010.

Current status
It provides products and services for both the Iranian government and the public.IEI is considered as the largest electronic conglomerate in Iran. It is an ISO 9000 company. Its products meet international military standards.

Motto
The company's motto is "Forging Ahead Daily".

Activities
The company currently maintains six subsidiaries which are each responsible for operational scopes in high-tech fields.

The subsidiaries and their respective industries are:

 SHIRAZ ELECTRONICS INDUSTRIES (SEI)
 Electronic Warfare Industry
 Avionics Industry
 Radar & Microwave Industry
 Naval Electronics Industry
 Mechanical Parts Industry
 Electro-Optics Industry
 Engineering and Tech. Support Industry
 Computer Peripheral Industry
 Missile Electronics Industry
 IRAN COMMUNICATION INDUSTRIES (IEI)
 Tactical Communication Industry
 Communication Security Industry
 Telecommunications Industry
 Mechanical Parts Industry
 Electronic Components Industry
 INFORMATION SYSTEMS OF IRAN (ISI)
 Setting up of computer sites
 Design and establishment of networks
 Maintenance of main frames and minicomputers
 LAN development and services (X.25)
 Offering super data base (SUPRA)
 Offering total solution projects (turn-key)
 High-grade training programs
 Software migration
 Handling of grand scale projects
 Consultation services
 ELECTRONIC COMPONENTS INDUSTRIES (ECI)
 Semi-conductors (transistors & ICs)
 Electronic credit cards
 Multilayer, single & double sided PCBs
 Hybrid circuits (thick films)
 Quartz crystals & oscillators
 High purity oxygen & nitrogen gases
 Micromodules
 Electronic ceramics
 ISFAHAN OPTICS INDUSTRIES (IOI)
 Computer Aided Design of optical elements
 Computer Aided Design of optical systems
 Computer Aided Design of multilayer coatings
 Production of different interference filters
 Production of long range binoculars
 Production of military periscopes for tanks
 Design and manufacture of reticles
 Advanced optical tests and measurements
 Transparent conductive coating
 Design and manufacture of optical sightsforguns
 Analysis of optical systems
 IRAN ELECTRONIC RESEARCH CENTER (IERC)

Its telecom products also include the assembly of mobile handsets under licence from the Belgian company Sagem.

See also
 International Rankings of Iran in Industry
 Iranian military industry
 Communications in Iran
 Iranian Space Agency

References

Electronics companies of Iran
Manufacturing companies based in Tehran
Government-owned companies of Iran
Conglomerate companies of Iran
Iranian brands
Defence companies of Iran
Iranian entities subject to the U.S. Department of the Treasury sanctions
Medical technology companies of Iran
Auto parts suppliers of Iran